Pola X is the soundtrack album to Léos Carax's film of the same name composed, and produced by the American solo artist Scott Walker. The soundtrack also includes contributions from Smog, Sonic Youth, Fairuz, Nguyên Lê, and M. Luobin Wang. It was released on 17 May 1999. It was Walker's first full soundtrack.

The soundtrack was recorded in Paris at Studios Davout, and in London at Lansdowne Recording Studio and Air Studios. Receiving positive reviews the soundtrack album was released in May 1999 on CD in France and Japan. All of Walker's compositions were later included on the fifth disc of Walker's 2003 boxset compilation 5 Easy Pieces.

Walker followed his scoring work on Pola X with scores for dance performances, namely 2007's And Who Shall Go to the Ball? And What Shall Go to the Ball? for the London-based CandoCo Dance Company and ROH2 production's performances of Jean Cocteau’s Duet for One in 2011. Prior to the soundtrack, Walker already had a long history of performing songs from films and contributing songs to soundtracks, most notably 1969's "The Rope and the Colt" for Une corde, un colt, 1971's "I Still See You" for The Go-Between, 1993's "Man from Reno" for Toxic Affair, and 1999's "Only Myself to Blame" for The World Is Not Enough OST.

Reception

Pola X received mixed to positive reviews by the majority of critics.

Track listing
All tracks performed and written by Scott Walker except where otherwise noted.

Personnel
 Jean-Claude Dubois - Orchestra Direction
 Geoff Foster - Mixing
 Paris Philharmonic Orchestra
 Brian Gascoigne - Orchestration 
 Scott Walker - Producer

References

External links

Scott Walker (singer) albums
Drama film soundtracks
Experimental rock soundtracks
1999 soundtrack albums
Albums produced by Scott Walker (singer)